Dois Quartos (In English: "Two Rooms"), launched in 2006, had its revival in 2007, selling each disc separately, is the 4th studio album and 6th career album of Brazilian singer, songwriter, arranger, producer Ana Carolina.

Reception

Jason Birchmeier, wrote for the magazine Billboard site and allmusic, saying that the album brings in its 24 songs, a strong style and sentimentality in the instrumental music. He also says that "Dois Quartos" is a highlight of the expression of Ana Carolina, and this album, poses as the biggest superstar of the MPB. He still isse that the subject of bisexuality, lends an air of curiosity in some of the songs. Even more, why is labeled strictly for adults".

In Brazil, Joao Paulo de Oliveira Bueno, wrote that there is a maturity and confidence in the production of the album: "Ana is more mature. Not that she was not before. Now the singer can bring to the music, presenting his point of view and even her bisexuality in the songs 'Homem e Mulher', 'Eu Comi a Madona', 'Rosas' and 'Eu Não Paro'.

Track list

1° CD

2° CD

Singles
 Rosas – It was the first single taken from "Room". Ranked first of all radios in this segment in Brazil.
 Carvão
 Ruas de outono
 Aqui
 Vai (Simone Saback)

Charts

Year-end charts

Certifications

References

2006 albums
2007 albums